Heir to Trouble is a 1935 American Western film directed by Spencer Gordon Bennet and written by Nate Gatzert. The film stars Ken Maynard, Joan Perry, Harry Woods, Martin Faust, Harry Bowen and Wally Wales. The film was released on December 17, 1935, by Columbia Pictures.

Plot

Cast            
Ken Maynard as Ken Armstrong
Joan Perry as Jane Parker
Harry Woods as Honest John Motley
Martin Faust as Ike Davis
Harry Bowen as Hank Carter
Wally Wales as 'Spurs' Hawkins 
Dorothea Wolbert as Tillie Tilks
Fern Emmett as Amanda Witherspoon
Pat O'Malley as Bill Dwyer

References

External links
 

1935 films
1930s English-language films
American Western (genre) films
1935 Western (genre) films
Columbia Pictures films
Films directed by Spencer Gordon Bennet
American black-and-white films
1930s American films